Edward Leslie Gray (April 8, 1895 – June 13, 1992) was a politician and member of the Legislative Assembly of Alberta from Alberta, Canada.

Gray was born April 8, 1895, in Maple Valley, Ontario to Samuel Gray and Mary Taylor, both of Irish descent.

Gray was elected in a by-election in the Edmonton after the death of George Van Allen. He also became the Alberta Liberal Party leader in 1937.  The by-election was considered the first test of strength for the Alberta Social Credit Party government.

Gray's election marked the beginning of the Unity Movement, despite running under the Liberal banner he was elected with the popular support of Conservatives.  He defeated 2 time Edmonton Mayor Joseph Clarke, who ran as a People's Candidate backed by Social Credit, and Communist Leader Jan Lakeman.

Gray served as Alberta Liberal Party leader until 1940, strongly favouring a coalition arrangement with the Conservatives and some former United Farmers of Alberta members against Social Credit.  The coalition ran under the name of the Independent Citizens' Association. He ran in Bow Valley in the 1940 Alberta election, but was defeated.

Gray died on June 13, 1992.

References

External links 
 Grande Prairie Herald October 8, 1938
 Legislative Assembly of Alberta Hansard Death Announcement
 Edward Leslie Gray birth and death date Alberta genealogy society

1895 births
1992 deaths
Leaders of the Alberta Liberal Party
Alberta Liberal Party MLAs
Ontario Agricultural College alumni
Politicians from Simcoe County